Expo '70 (also written Expo Seventy) is an American drone / space rock group, founded in 2003 by Justin Wright in Los Angeles, California, who shortly afterwards moved back to his native Kansas City, Missouri. Expo '70 is mainly the project of Wright, but often features additional musicians in the studio and is a trio live. Wright also runs his own record label called Sonic Meditations.

References

External links
 Expo Seventy official website
 Expo '70 on Bandcamp
 Expo '70 on Facebook
 
 

Psychedelic rock music groups from California
Musical groups established in 2003
Musical groups from Los Angeles
American space rock musical groups